Engin Ayhan (9 January 1984 – 25 December 2020), commonly known as Engin Nurşani, was a Turkish-German folk musician. He started his music career with the Adına Bir Çizik Çektim album in 2003, and released eight albums in total until he had throat cancer in 2019 and took a temporary break from his music career. On 25 December 2020, he died at Istanbul Acıbadem Altunizade Hospital at around 07:00am (UTC+3).

Life and career
Nursani was born in 1984 as one of two children of a Kurdish father and a German mother. His father, Ali Ayhan (born 1959), is a folk music artist. When he was a child, he was trained in music by his father and attended concerts.

Discography
Adına Bir Çizik Çektim (2003)
Mutlu musun? (2004)
Sen Nefsine Köle Oldun (2006)
Üç Ozan Üç Oğul (2008)
Üç Ozan Üç Oğul 2 (2011)
Gözün Aydın (2012)
Kolay mı Sandın? (2017)
Bu Dünyada Yalnız Kaldım (2021)

References

External links
Engin Nursani's Songtext

Turkish male singers
German artists
Turkish artists
Turkish folk musicians
German people of Turkish descent
1984 births
2020 deaths
Deaths from throat cancer
Deaths from cancer in Turkey